Michael Kaballarios was a Byzantine aristocrat and military leader. In ca. 1277 he was megas konostaulos (commander of the Latin mercenaries). Along with the megas stratopedarches John Synadenos, he led a Byzantine army against John I Doukas of Thessaly, but was defeated in the Battle of Pharsalus and died shortly afterwards of his wounds.

Sources 
 
 

1277 deaths
13th-century Byzantine military personnel
Byzantine generals
Byzantines killed in battle
Michael
Year of birth unknown
Michael VIII Palaiologos
Megaloi konostauloi